Frederick 'Big Dogg' Bailey (born 25 April 1997) is an English professional rugby league footballer who plays for St Helens in the Super League, as a .

Club career
Signed for St Helens from Wigan amateur side Shevington Sharks. A former Telford Raiders junior, Bailey made his Saints début on 6 April 2015 in a Super League match against Hull F.C.

He is to spend the 2018 season on loan at the Leigh Centurions in the Betfred Championship. Bailey made his Leigh début in an 8-4 victory over Batley Bulldogs in the Challenge Cup where he scored the only try of the game.

References

External links
Leigh Centurions profile
Saints Heritage Society profile

1997 births
Living people
English rugby league players
Leigh Leopards players
Rugby league fullbacks
Rugby league players from Shropshire
Rugby league wingers
Sportspeople from Shropshire
St Helens R.F.C. players
Workington Town players